A forehead kiss is a social kissing gesture to indicate friendship and/or to denote comforting someone. A forehead kiss is a sign of adoration and affection. In some Arabic cultures, the forehead kiss is a gesture of apology as well as a sign of acknowledgment of grievance on the part of the person being kissed. Other regions where the forehead kiss has been noted is in Kurdish societies wherein it is usually the older person kissing the younger person on the forehead. Likewise, the forehead kiss is a more acceptable, and subtle, public display of affection. It allows for emotion and passion to be passed from one partner to another, without involving the eyes of those around them like other public displays of affection would.

However, it has been argued that the act of kissing a person's forehead is not romantic. Instead such an act is purely neutral and should not be used when trying to transfer feelings of emotion, lust, love, or so on. It's been said to lack certain qualities that make other kisses more romantic and therefore should not be thought of as a gesture for expressing non-platonic love. It is even stated that the kiss is used as a means of imposing distance in certain situations.

Use in media 

The forehead kiss has been used in many different forms of media. In the film medium, the forehead kiss exists in horror, comedy, science thriller, and other genres. Likewise, if someone is in search of a meaningful quote regarding forehead kisses and what they can represent, searching on Pinterest will reveal a myriad of choices; all of which, seem to tackle a different sector of the forehead kiss. In its use here, sector is referring to the different meanings the kiss can have, like friendship, love, and non-sexual attachment.

See also 
 Public display of affection
 Salute
 Kiss

References

Gestures
Kissing